The Men's individual pursuit event of the 2016 UCI Track Cycling World Championships was held on 4 March 2016. Filippo Ganna of Italy won the gold medal.

Results

Qualifying
The qualifying was held at 10:47.

Finals
The finals were started at 19:40.

References

Men's individual pursuit
UCI Track Cycling World Championships – Men's individual pursuit